Chhatinasol is a village in the Gopiballavpur I CD block in the Jhargram subdivision of the Jhargram district in the state of West Bengal, India.

Geography

Location

Jhargram subdivision, the only one in Jhargram district, shown in the map alongside, is composed of  hills, mounds and rolling lands. It is rather succinctly described in the District Human Development Report, 2011 (at that time it was part of Paschim Medinipur district), “The western boundary is more broken and picturesque, for the lower ranges of the Chhotanagpur Hills line the horizon, the jungle assumes the character of forest, and large trees begin to predominate. The soil, however, is lateritic, a considerable area is unproductive, almost uninhabited, especially in the extreme north-west where there are several hills over 1000 feet in height. The remainder of the country is an almost level plain broken only by the sand hills.” 3.48% of the population lives in urban areas and 96.52% lives in the rural areas. 20.11% of the total population belonged to scheduled castes and 29.37% belonged to scheduled tribes.

Demographics
According to the 2011 Census of India, Chhatinasol had a total population of 1,040 of which 538 (52%) were males and 502 (48%) were females. Population in the age range 0–6 years was 143. The total number of literate persons in Chhatinasol was 590 (56.73% of the population over 6 years).

Civic administration

CD block HQ
The headquarters of Gopiballavpur I CD block are located at Chhatinasol.

Transport
State Highway 9 (West Bengal) running from Durgapur (in Paschim Bardhaman district) to Nayagram (in Jhargram district) passes through Chhatinasol.

References

Villages in Jhargram district